The 2006 Bhiwandi lynching was the murder of two police constables in Bhiwandi, Thane district, Maharashtra, India by a Muslim mob. They were killed and then burned after police had shot at a mob pelting stones causing the death of two Muslim men. The bodies of the policemen were discovered at a distance variously stated as 200 metres and 500 metres from a police outpost. An existing curfew was extended after the event, described by The Times of India as a lynching. Some reports said the constables were stabbed to death. The police constables have been identified as R.Y. Jagtap of the Bhoiwada police station and B.R. Gangurde of the Narpoli police station.

References

External links
Mumbaimirror.com

Lynching deaths in India
Bhiwandi
2006 murders in India
Murder in India
Crime in Maharashtra
People murdered in Maharashtra